The 1995–96 SM-liiga season was the 21st season of the SM-liiga, the top level of ice hockey in Finland. 12 teams participated in the league, and Jokerit Helsinki won the championship.

Standings

Playoffs

Quarterfinals
 Jokerit - Ilves 3:0 (11:2, 7:2, 3:1)
 TPS - Ässät 3:0 (4:0, 4:2, 6:3)
 Lukko - HIFK 3:0 (2:1, 6:4, 4:1)
 Tappara - HPK 1:3 (1:3, 3:5, 7:2, 1:7)

Semifinals
 Jokerit - HPK 3:1 (2:3, 3:0, 4:1, 6:0)
 TPS - Lukko 3:1 (2:3, 3:1, 4:2, 4:2)

3rd place
 Lukko - HPK 2:1

Final
 Jokerit - TPS 3:1 (0:1, 6:1, 5:1, 4:1)

External links
 SM-liiga official website

1995–96 in Finnish ice hockey
Finnish
Liiga seasons